Mid Oxfordshire was a parliamentary constituency in Oxfordshire. Unusually, its official name - Mid-Oxon - incorporated an abbreviation (Oxon, for Oxonia) but the full form of the county name was and is normally used in referring to the constituency. During its existence Mid Oxfordshire returned one Member of Parliament (MP)  to the House of Commons of the Parliament of the United Kingdom.

The constituency was created for the February 1974 general election from parts of the seats of Banbury and Henley, and abolished for the 1983 general election.

Boundaries
The constituency was formed largely from the County Constituency of Banbury, incorporating the Urban and Rural Districts of Witney and the parts of the Rural District of Ploughley in Banbury, including Kidlington.  Also included further parts of the Rural District of Ploughley (to the south of Bicester) and northernmost parts of the Rural District of Bullingdon (to the east of Oxford), transferred from Henley.

It was abolished in 1983, following the reform of local government districts which came into effect in 1974.  The bulk of the constituency, including the areas constituting the former Urban and Rural Districts of Witney, together with the town of Kidlington, formed the new County Constituency of Witney.  Eastern rural areas transferred to Banbury and Henley, with the wards of Marston and Risinghurst being included in the new Borough Constituency of Oxford East.

Members of Parliament

Elections

References 

Parliamentary constituencies in Oxfordshire (historic)
Constituencies of the Parliament of the United Kingdom established in 1974
Constituencies of the Parliament of the United Kingdom disestablished in 1983